The event was held on February 21 at Park City. Stephan Eberharter, age 32.9, became the oldest man to win an alpine event at the Olympics.

Results
Complete results from the men's giant slalom event at the 2002 Winter Olympics.

References

External links
 Official Olympic Report

Giant slalom